Susanna Fogel is an American director, screenwriter and author, best known for co-writing the 2019 film Booksmart and for co-writing and directing the 2018 action/comedy The Spy Who Dumped Me. Her many accolades include a DGA Award and nominations at the BAFTA Film Awards, the Primetime Emmy Awards and the WGA Awards.

Early life and education 
Fogel was born in Providence, Rhode Island, where her parents were both faculty at Brown University. Her father is the neuropsychiatrist and Harvard Medical School professor Barry S. Fogel, who founded the American Neuropsychiatric Association, and her mother, Margaret Selkin Fogel, is a psychologist. Her grandfather, Daniel Fogel, was a personal lawyer to Los Angeles Mayor Tom Bradley. Her uncle, Jeremy Fogel,  is a former United States district judge of the United States District Court for the Northern District of California.

In the summer before her senior year in college, she worked for James Schamus while he was producing Ang Lee's The Hulk. She graduated from Columbia University in 2002. At Columbia, she was a writer of its 2001 Varsity Show. Her classmates included television writer and producer Lang Fisher.

Career
Fogel and her writing partner Joni Lefkowitz originally wrote Life Partners as a one act play. They eventually adapted it into a screenplay which Fogel went on to direct. The film premiered at the 2014 Tribeca Film Festival.

Fogel co-created and executive produced the Lionsgate/ABC drama series Chasing Life, which ran for two seasons.

Fogel co-wrote the script for Booksmart with Emily Halpern, Sarah Haskins and Katie Silberman and was originally hired to direct the project, but was replaced during preproduction. The screenplay was later nominated for the BAFTA Award for Best Original Screenplay and the Writers Guild of America Award for Best Original Screenplay.

Frustrated by her experiences in the industry, Fogel co-wrote and directed the action-comedy The Spy Who Dumped Me. The film was released in 2018 and starred Mila Kunis and Kate McKinnon, the latter of whom had appeared briefly in Fogel's debut film.

She directed the pilot episodes for the television series The Wilds on Amazon, and The Flight Attendant on HBO Max, which she also Executive Produced. She has also directed episodes of Gillian Flynn’s Utopia, also for Amazon, and the return of Steven Spielberg’s Amazing Stories for Apple TV+. The Flight Attendant was nominated in the category of Best Television Series (Musical or Comedy) at the 2021 Golden Globe Awards.

She has been announced as the director for the upcoming feature film 'Winner', about the life of American whistleblower Reality Winner, and as the co-writer and director of the action-thriller 'The Mentor' for Sony Pictures.

Fogel has also been announced as the director of Cat Person; a thriller based upon the short story by Kristen Roupenian that will explore "the hellscape of modern romance and the idea that we have all been the villain in someone else’s story, and the victim in others", and that will star Emilia Jones and Nicholas Braun.

In April 2021 Fogel was awarded the DGA Award in the Outstanding Directorial Achievement in a Comedy Series category for her work on The Flight Attendant. In July 2021 she was nominated for an Emmy Award for Best Comedy Director, also for The Flight Attendant.

She is a co-screenwriter of The Addams Family 2.

Writing career
Fogel is a regular contributor to The New Yorker online.

Her novel, Nuclear Family: A Tragicomic Novel in Letters, was published in 2017.

Filmography

Film
Director
 Life Partners (2014)
 The Spy Who Dumped Me (2018)
 Cat Person (2023)
 Winner (2024)

Writer
 Booksmart (2019)
 The Addams Family 2 (2021)

Television

Awards and nominations

See also
 List of female film and television directors
 List of LGBT-related films directed by women

References

External links
 
 

American women screenwriters
American women film directors
Living people
Year of birth missing (living people)
Columbia College (New York) alumni
People from Providence, Rhode Island
Directors Guild of America Award winners
21st-century American women